The Shire of Wangaratta was a local government area in the North Queensland region of Queensland, Australia.

History
On 11 November 1879, Wangaratta Division was created on 11 November 1879 as one of 74 divisions around Queensland under the Divisional Boards Act 1879 with a population of 789.

With the passage of the Local Authorities Act 1902, Wangaratta Division became the Shire of Wangaratta on 31 March 1903.

On 2 April 1960, the Shire of Wangaratta was amalgamated with the Town of Bowen creating the new Shire of Bowen.

Chairmen
 1927: Arthur Henry Wickham Cunningham

References

External links
 

Former local government areas of Queensland
1879 establishments in Australia
1960 disestablishments in Australia